Governor Morgan may refer to:

Edwin D. Morgan (1811–1883), 21st Governor of New York
Elliot S. N. Morgan (1832–1894), Acting Governor of Wyoming Territory in 1885, and from 1886 to 1887
Ephraim F. Morgan (1869–1950), 16th Governor of West Virginia